Abdulaziz Dhafir (born 3 January 2001) is a Saudi Arabian professional footballer who plays as a midfielder for Pro League side Al-Faisaly.

Career 
Dhafir started at Al-Faisaly's youth team and was promoted to the first team during the 2021–22 season. On 27 August 2021, Dhafir made his professional debut for Al-Faisaly against Al-Ittihad in the Pro League, replacing Guilherme.

Career statistics

Club

References

External links 
 

2001 births
Living people
Saudi Arabian footballers
Saudi Arabia youth international footballers
Al-Faisaly FC players
Saudi Professional League players
Saudi First Division League players
Association football midfielders